Anna Viktorovna Vyakhireva (born 13 March 1995) is a Russian female handballer, who plays for Vipers Kristiansand and the Russian national team.

Biography
She started playing handball at her sister's training sessions at the age of six. Anna's older sister is Polina Kuznetsova, 2007 world champion and a member of the All-Star team at the 2012 European Women's Handball Championship. Her father, Victor Vyakhirev, was a women's handball coach, he in 2013 was on duty with the Zvezda Zvenigorod youth team.

Achievements
Olympic Games:
Gold Medalist: 2016
Silver Medalist: 2020
World Championship:
Bronze Medalist: 2019
European Championship:
Silver Medalist: 2018
Russian Super League
Gold Medalist: 2016, 2017, 2018, 2019, 2020
Bronze Medalist: 2013, 2015
Russian Cup:
Winner: 2014, 2017, 2018, 2019, 2020
Runner-up: 2016
Russian Supercup:
Winner: 2016, 2017, 2018, 2019, 2020
Norwegian League:
Gold: 2022/2023
Norwegian Cup:
Winner: 2022/23
EHF Champions League:
Finalist: 2018/2019
Fourth place: 2017/2018
EHF Cup Winners' Cup:
Finalist: 2014
European Junior Championship:
Gold Medalist: 2013
World Youth Championship:
Silver Medalist: 2012
European Youth Championship:
Gold Medalist: 2011
Silver Medalist: 2009

Individual awards 
MVP
 Most Valuable Player of the Youth World Championship: 2012
 Most Valuable Player of the European Junior Championship: 2013
 Most Valuable Player of the Russian Super League: 2015/2016, 2019/2020
 Most Valuable Player of the Summer Olympics: 2016, 2020
 Most Valuabe Player of the European Championship: 2018

All Star Team
 All-Star Centre Back of the European Youth Championship: 2009
 All-Star Right Wing of the European Youth Championship: 2011
 All-Star Right Back of the Junior World Championship: 2012
 All-Star Right Wing of the Junior World Championship: 2014
 All-Star Right Back of the Russian Super League: 2015/2016, 2018/2019, 2019/2020
 All-Star Right Back of the Champions League: 2019
 All-Star Right Back of the Champions League: 2020
 All-Star Right Back of the World Championship: 2019
 All-Star Right Back of the Summer Olympics: 2020

Other
 EHF player of the month (5): June 2018, October 2018, December 2018, September 2019, December 2019
 Handball-Planet.com All-Star Right Back of the Year: 2018, 2019
 Handball-Planet.com World Female Player of the Year: 2019
 Handball-Planet.com All-Star Young Right Back of the year: 2015/2016, 2016/2017
 Handball-Planet.com Young World Female Player of the Year: 2015/2016, 2016/2017

References

External links

1995 births
Living people
Sportspeople from Volgograd
Russian female handball players
Olympic medalists in handball
Olympic handball players of Russia
Olympic gold medalists for Russia
Medalists at the 2016 Summer Olympics
Handball players at the 2016 Summer Olympics
Universiade medalists in handball
Universiade gold medalists for Russia
Medalists at the 2015 Summer Universiade
Handball players at the 2020 Summer Olympics
Medalists at the 2020 Summer Olympics
Olympic silver medalists for the Russian Olympic Committee athletes